All the Wrong Places may refer to:
 All the Wrong Places (book), 1988 reports from Asia by the English journalist and poet James Fenton
 All the Wrong Places (film), a 2000 American romantic comedy directed by Martin Edwards
 An episode from Australian TV series McLeod's Daughters (season 7) 2007
 All the Wrong Places (novel), a 2019 novel by Joy Fielding
 "All the Wrong Places" (song) a 2013 song by the British rapper Example
 The byline to the song "Lookin' for Love" from the soundtrack of the film Urban Cowboy